Below are the results of the 2014 World Series of Poker, held from May 27-July 14 at the Rio All Suite Hotel and Casino in Paradise, Nevada.

Key

Results

Event #1: $500 Casino Employees No Limit Hold'em

 3-Day Event: May 27–29
 Number of Entries: 876
 Total Prize Pool: $394,200
 Number of Payouts: 90
 Winning Hand:

Event #2: $25,000 Mixed Max No Limit Hold'em

 4-Day Event: May 27–30
 Number of Entries: 131
 Total Prize Pool: $3,111,250
 Number of Payouts: 16
 Winning Hand:

Event #3: $1,000 Pot Limit Omaha

 3-Day Event: May 28–30
 Number of Entries: 1,128
 Total Prize Pool: $1,015,200
 Number of Payouts: 117
 Winning Hand:

Event #4: $1,000 No Limit Hold'em

 3-Day Event: May 29–31
 Number of Entries: 2,223
 Total Prize Pool: $2,000,700
 Number of Payouts: 243
 Winning Hand:

Event #5: $10,000 Limit 2-7 Triple Draw Lowball

 3-Day Event: May 29–31
 Number of Entries: 120
 Total Prize Pool: $1,128,000
 Number of Payouts: 12
 Winning Hand: 9-6-4-3-2

Event #6: $1,500 No Limit Hold'em Shootout

 3-Day Event: May 30-June 1
 Number of Entries: 948
 Total Prize Pool: $1,279,800
 Number of Payouts: 120
 Winning Hand:

Event #7: $1,500 Seven Card Razz

 3-Day Event: May 30-June 1 
 Number of Entries: 352
 Total Prize Pool: $475,200
 Number of Payouts: 40
 Winning Hand: 9-3-A-6-7-6-A

Event #8: $1,500 Millionaire Maker No Limit Hold'em

 4-Day Event: May 31-June 3
 Number of Entries: 7,977
 Total Prize Pool: $10,768,950
 Number of Payouts: 819
 Winning Hand:

Event #9: $1,000 No Limit Hold'em

 3-Day Event: June 1–3
 Number of Entries: 1,940
 Total Prize Pool: $1,746,000
 Number of Payouts: 198
 Winning Hand:

Event #10: $10,000 Limit Omaha Hi-Low Split-8 or Better

 3-Day Event: June 1–3
 Number of Entries: 178
 Total Prize Pool: $1,673,200
 Number of Payouts: 18
 Winning Hand:

Event #11: $1,500 No Limit Hold'em Six Handed

 3-Day Event: June 2–4
 Number of Entries: 1,587
 Total Prize Pool: $2,142,450
 Number of Payouts: 162
 Winning Hand:

Event #12: $1,500 Pot Limit Hold'em

 3-Day Event: June 3–5
 Number of Entries: 557
 Total Prize Pool: $751,950
 Number of Payouts: 63
 Winning Hand:

Event #13: $10,000 No Limit 2-7 Draw Lowball

 3-Day Event: June 3–5
 Number of Entries: 87
 Total Prize Pool: $817,800
 Number of Payouts: 14
 Winning Hand: J-10-7-6-3

Event #14: $1,500 Limit Omaha Hi-Low Split-8 or Better

 3-Day Event: June 4–6
 Number of Entries: 1,036
 Total Prize Pool: $1,398,600
 Number of Payouts: 117
 Winning Hand:

Event #15: $3,000 No Limit Hold'em Six Handed

 4-Day Event: June 5–8
 Number of Entries: 810
 Total Prize Pool: $2,211,300
 Number of Payouts: 90
 Winning Hand:

Event #16: $1,500 Limit 2-7 Triple Draw Lowball

 3-Day Event: June 5–7
 Number of Entries: 348
 Total Prize Pool: $469,800
 Number of Payouts: 36
 Winning Hand: 10-8-5-4-2

Event #17: $1,000 Seniors No Limit Hold'em Championship

 3-Day Event: June 6–8
 Number of Entries: 4,425
 Total Prize Pool: $3,982,500
 Number of Payouts: 468
 Winning Hand:

Event #18: $10,000 Seven Card Razz

 3-Day Event: June 6–8
 Number of Entries: 112
 Total Prize Pool: $1,052,800
 Number of Payouts: 16
 Winning Hand:

Event #19: $1,500 No Limit Hold'em

 3-Day Event: June 7–9
 Number of Entries: 2,086
 Total Prize Pool: $2,816,100
 Number of Payouts: 216
 Winning Hand:

Event #20: $3,000 No Limit Hold'em Shootout

 3-Day Event: June 7–9
 Number of Entries: 389
 Total Prize Pool: $1,061,970
 Number of Payouts: 40
 Winning Hand:

Event #21: $1,000 No Limit Hold'em

 3-Day Event: June 8–10
 Number of Entries: 2,043
 Total Prize Pool: $1,838,700
 Number of Payouts: 216
 Winning Hand:

Event #22: $10,000 H.O.R.S.E.

 3-Day Event: June 8–10
 Number of Entries: 200
 Total Prize Pool: $1,880,000
 Number of Payouts: 24
 Winning Hand:  (Stud 8)

Event #23: $1,000 Turbo No Limit Hold'em

 2-Day Event: June 9–10
 Number of Entries: 1,473
 Total Prize Pool: $1,325,700
 Number of Payouts: 171
 Winning Hand:

Event #24: $5,000 No Limit Hold'em Six Handed

 4-Day Event: June 10–13
 Number of Entries: 541
 Total Prize Pool: $2,542,700
 Number of Payouts: 60
 Winning Hand:

Event #25: $2,500 Omaha/Seven Card Stud HI-Low Split-8 or Better

 3-Day Event: June 10–12
 Number of Entries: 470
 Total Prize Pool: $1,069,250
 Number of Payouts: 48
 Winning Hand:

Event #26: $1,500 No Limit Hold'em

 3-Day Event: June 11–13
 Number of Entries: 1,594
 Total Prize Pool: $2,151,900
 Number of Payouts: 171
 Winning Hand:

Event #27: $1,500 H.O.R.S.E.

 3-Day Event: June 12–14 
 Number of Entries: 743
 Total Prize Pool: $1,003,050
 Number of Payouts: 80
 Winning Hand:  (Hold'em)

Event #28: $10,000 Pot Limit Hold'em

 3-Day Event: June 12–14
 Number of Entries: 160
 Total Prize Pool: $1,504,000
 Number of Payouts: 18
 Winning Hand:

Event #29: $2,500 No Limit Hold'em

 3-Day Event: June 13–15
 Number of Entries: 1,165
 Total Prize Pool: $2,650,375
 Number of Payouts: 117
 Winning Hand:

Event #30: $1,500 Seven Card Stud Hi-Low 8-or Better

 3-Day Event: June 13–15
 Number of Entries: 588
 Total Prize Pool: $793,800
 Number of Payouts: 64
 Winning Hand:

Event #31: $1,500 No Limit Hold'em

 3-Day Event: June 14–16
 Number of Entries: 1,631
 Total Prize Pool: $2,201,850
 Number of Payouts: 171
 Winning Hand:

Event #32: $10,000 No Limit Hold'em Six Handed

 3-Day Event: June 14–16
 Number of Entries: 264
 Total Prize Pool: $2,481,600
 Number of Payouts: 30
 Winning Hand:

Event #33: $1,000 No Limit Hold'em

 3-Day Event: June 15–17
 Number of Entries: 1,688
 Total Prize Pool: $1,519,200
 Number of Payouts: 171
 Winning Hand:

Event #34: $1,500 Seven Card Stud

 3-Day Event: June 15–17
 Number of Entries: 345
 Total Prize Pool: $465,750
 Number of Payouts: 40
 Winning Hand:

Event #35: $5,000 No Limit Hold'em Eight Handed

 3-Day Event: June 16–18
 Number of Entries: 550
 Total Prize Pool: $2,585,000
 Number of Payouts: 56
 Winning Hand:

Event #36: $1,500 No Limit 2-7 Draw Lowball

 3-Day Event: June 16–18
 Number of Entries: 241
 Total Prize Pool: $325,350
 Number of Payouts: 28
 Winning Hand: 9-8-7-5-2

Event #37: $1,500 Pot Limit Omaha

 3-Day Event: June 17–19
 Number of Entries: 967
 Total Prize Pool: $1,305,450
 Number of Payouts: 117
 Winning Hand:

Event #38: $10,000 Seven Card Stud Hi-Low Split-8 or Better

 3-Day Event: June 17–19 
 Number of Entries: 134
 Total Prize Pool: $1,259,600
 Number of Payouts: 16
 Winning Hand:

Event #39: $3,000 No Limit Hold'em

 4-Day Event: June 18–21
 Number of Entries: 992
 Total Prize Pool: $2,708,160
 Number of Payouts: 117
 Winning Hand:

Event #40: $10,000 Heads Up No Limit Hold'em

 3-Day Event: June 19–21
 Number of Entries: 136
 Total Prize Pool: $1,198,400
 Number of Payouts: 16
 Winning Hand:

Event #41: $1,500 Dealer's Choice Six Handed

 3-Day Event: June 19–21
 Number of Entries: 419
 Total Prize Pool: $565,650
 Number of Payouts: 42
 Winning Hand: A-2-3-5-6 (A-5 Triple Draw)

Event #42: $5,000 Pot Limit Omaha Six Handed

 3-Day Event: June 20–22
 Number of Entries: 452
 Total Prize Pool: $2,124,400
 Number of Payouts: 48
 Winning Hand:

Event #43: $1,500 Limit Hold'em

 3-Day Event: June 20–22
 Number of Entries: 657
 Total Prize Pool: $886,950
 Number of Payouts: 72
 Winning Hand:

Event #44: $1,500 No Limit Hold'em

 4-Day Event: June 21–24
 Number of Entries: 1,914
 Total Prize Pool: $2,583,900
 Number of Payouts: 198
 Winning Hand:

Event #45: $1,000 No Limit Hold'em

 3-Day Event: June 22–24
 Number of Entries: 1,841
 Total Prize Pool: $1,656,900
 Number of Payouts: 198
 Winning Hand:

Event #46: $50,000 The Poker Players Championship

 5-Day Event: June 22–26
 Number of Entries: 102
 Total Prize Pool: $4,896,000
 Number of Payouts: 14
 Winning Hand:  (No Limit Hold'em)

Event #47: $1,500 Ante Only No Limit Hold'em

 3-Day Event: June 23–25
 Number of Entries: 714
 Total Prize Pool: $963,900
 Number of Payouts: 72
 Winning Hand:

Event #48: $1,500 Pot Limit Omaha Hi-Low Split-8 or Better

 3-Day Event: June 24–26
 Number of Entries: 991
 Total Prize Pool: $1,337,850
 Number of Payouts: 117
 Winning Hand:

Event #49: $5,000 No Limit Hold'em

 4-Day Event: June 25–28
 Number of Entries: 696
 Total Prize Pool: $3,271,200
 Number of Payouts: 72
 Winning Hand:

Event #50: $1,500 Eight Game Mix

 3-Day Event: June 25–27
 Number of Entries: 485
 Total Prize Pool: $654,750
 Number of Payouts: 49
 Winning Hand:  (Omaha-8)

Event #51: $1,500 No Limit Hold'em Monster Stack

 5-Day Event: June 26–30
 Number of Entries: 7,862
 Total Prize Pool: $10,613,700
 Number of Payouts: 792
 Winning Hand:

Event #52: $10,000 Limit Hold'em

 3-Day Event: June 26–28
 Number of Entries: 122
 Total Prize Pool: $1,146,800
 Number of Payouts: 18
 Winning Hand:

Event #53: $10,000 Ladies No Limit Hold'em Championship

 3-Day Event: June 27–29
 Number of Entries: 793
 Total Prize Pool: $713,700
 Number of Payouts: 81
 Winning Hand:

Event #54: $3,000 Pot Limit Omaha Hi-Low Split-8 or Better

 3-Day Event: June 27–29
 Number of Entries: 474
 Total Prize Pool: $1,294,020
 Number of Payouts: 54
 Winning Hand:

Event #55: $1,500 No Limit Hold'em

 3-Day Event: June 28–30
 Number of Entries: 2,396
 Total Prize Pool: $3,234,600
 Number of Payouts: 243
 Winning Hand:

Event #56: $1,000 No Limit Hold'em

 3-Day Event: June 29-July 1
 Number of Entries: 2,525
 Total Prize Pool: $2,272,500
 Number of Payouts: 270
 Winning Hand:

Event #57: $1,000,000 The Big One for One Drop

 3-Day Event: June 29-July 1
 Number of Entries: 42
 Total Prize Pool: $37,333,338
 Number of Payouts: 8
 Winning Hand:

Event #58: $1,500 No Limit Hold'em Mixed Max

 3-Day Event: June 30-July 2
 Number of Entries: 1,475
 Total Prize Pool: $1,991,250
 Number of Payouts: 162
 Winning Hand:

Event #59: $3,000 Omaha Hi-Low Split-8 or Better

 3-Day Event: June 30-July 2
 Number of Entries: 457
 Total Prize Pool: $1,247,610
 Number of Payouts: 54
 Winning Hand:

Event #60: $1,500 No Limit Hold'em

 4-Day Event: July 1–4
 Number of Entries: 2,563
 Total Prize Pool: $3,460,050
 Number of Payouts: 270
 Winning Hand:

Event #61: $10,000 Seven Card Stud

 3-Day Event: July 1–3
 Number of Entries: 102
 Total Prize Pool: $958,800
 Number of Payouts: 16
 Winning Hand:

Event #62: $1,111 The Little One for One Drop

 5-Day Event: July 2–6
 Number of Entries: 4,496
 Total Prize Pool: $4,046,400
 Number of Payouts: 468
 Winning Hand:

Event #63: $1,500 10-Game Mix Six Handed

 3-Day Event: July 2–4
 Number of Entries: 445
 Total Prize Pool: $600,750
 Number of Payouts: 48
 Winning Hand:  (No Limit Hold'em)

Event #64: $10,000 Pot Limit Omaha

 3-Day Event: July 3–5
 Number of Entries: 418
 Total Prize Pool: $3,929,200
 Number of Payouts: 45
 Winning Hand:

Event #65: $10,000 No Limit Hold'em Main Event

 10-Day Event: July 5–14 
Final Table: November 10–11
 Number of Entries: 6,683
 Total Prize Pool: $62,820,200
 Number of Payouts: 693
 Winning Hand:

Other High Finishes
NB: This list is restricted to top 30 finishers with an existing Wikipedia entry.

World Series of Poker
World Series of Poker